Fusilli are a variety of pasta that are formed into corkscrew or helical shapes. The word fusilli presumably comes from fuso ("spindle"), as traditionally it is "spun" by pressing and rolling a small rod over the thin strips of pasta to wind them around it in a corkscrew shape.

In addition to plain and whole wheat varieties, as with any pasta, other colours can be made by mixing other ingredients into the dough, which also affects the flavour, for example, beetroot or tomato for red, spinach for green, and cuttlefish ink for black.

Variants
Fusilli may be solid or hollow. A variant type of fusilli are formed as hollow tubes of pasta that are twisted into springs or corkscrews and are called fusilli bucati. Another variant are twisted long lengths as though spaghetti were coiled around an object known as fusilli lunghi. Fusilli Napoletani are flat lengths of coiled pasta formed around a spindle. A variant known as rotini is generally extruded into a twisted shape rather than shaped as a coil spring, although the terms rotini and fusili are often used interchangeably, especially in the United States.

See also
 The Fusilli Jerry

References

External links

Types of pasta